Ben Redmond Lawton, M.D., F.A.C.S. (July 17, 1922 – May 18, 1987) was an eminent physician, general and thoracic surgeon, healthcare-reformer, educator, and President of the University of Wisconsin Board of Regents from 1984 to 1986.

Early life and education 
Ben Lawton was the third of four Lawton siblings, born on July 17, 1922 in Viroqua, Wisconsin, where his father, John Cliff Lawton, was a teacher and public school administrator. Ben was subsequently raised by his mother, Cora Lawton (née Wheeler) and his grandmother, Margaret Wheeler, after his father's death in 1935.  Ben attended public schools in Vernon County, Wisconsin.  Lawton was admitted to the University of Wisconsin (UW) in 1940, where he majored in zoology and was elected to membership in Phi Eta Sigma, a national honor society.  After completing his bachelor's degree (working part-time as a milkman), Ben matriculated to the University of Wisconsin School of Medicine, learning under the influence of Dean William Shainline Middleton and obtaining his M.D. degree in 1948 as a member of the Alpha Omega Alpha medical honor society. He then pursued residency training in general surgery at the University of Wisconsin General Hospital, followed by a fellowship in cardiothoracic surgery.  Lawton served in the U.S. Army Medical Corps during the Korean War, and returned to Wisconsin in 1954.

Career at the Marshfield Clinic
At that time, the Marshfield Clinic (MC), in Marshfield, WI, was expanding its medical staff to build a multispecialty capability. Dr. Lawton joined the MC as its 22nd physician and its first board-certified thoracic surgeon. Over the ensuing 33 years he performed over 30,000 operations, served as MC President for several terms, and worked with other colleagues (most notably Dr. George Magnin, an internist, &  Dr. Russell Lewis, a gynecologist) to enlarge and diversify the MC facilities and staff.  By the year 2000, over 250 physicians practiced there. Dr. Lawton was a Clinical Professor of Surgery at UW, and he served as a preceptor to scores of senior medical students throughout his career. In addition, Lawton published more than 40 scholarly papers in the peer-reviewed medical literature.

Medical-political activism
Lawton became involved in Wisconsin state politics in the 1950s, as a registered Democrat. As his obituary in the Milwaukee Journal stated, he was "stubbornly liberal when it was fashionable and when it was not."  Recognized for his activism as well as his medical skills, Dr. Lawton was elected to the Wisconsin State Board of Medical Examiners in 1962, and he served as its President in 1965. When Wisconsin Governor Patrick Lucey was elected in 1970, he constituted a state Health Planning Policy Task Force and named Lawton as its chairperson. That organization worked to codify public healthcare policy which is still in place. Dr. Lawton was appointed to the UW Board of Regents in the early 1970s, and he was elected to its presidency in 1984.  It was during his Board tenure that the entire system of public universities in Wisconsin was consolidated under one center of governance.  This was a controversial but successful venture, and one in which Lawton played a key administrative role.

In 1965, President Lyndon B. Johnson had appointed Lawton to the National Institute of Medicine. This event recognized Lawton's advocacy for egalitarianism, service to the underprivileged, and development of modern medical research and education. In recognition of these contributions, Dr. Lawton received a pen used by President Johnson in 1965 to sign the Medicare Bill into law.

Lawton was always a forward-thinker regarding the delivery of medical care, and was one of the first vocal supporters of physician assistant (PA) training programs. The University of Wisconsin Lawton Award is given yearly to a minority PA student there. The Lawton Center for Medical Research and the Lawton Society were also dedicated to him at the MC.

Personal information; illness & death
Lawton had lost his father at age 13 and grew up in limited circumstances.  He married Ruth M. Klahn (1922-2009) in 1944, and had four children with her: Daniel, Richard, Ben, and Margaret. Mrs. Lawton developed an incurable ocular illness that left her totally sightless. Dr. Lawton acted as her eyes during most of their 43 years of marriage. Daniel Lawton also predeceased his father as a young adult.

Lawton had a nearly-fatal myocardial infarct in 1977; after a difficult recovery, he resumed all of his professional activities.  However, Lawton ultimately developed pancreatic carcinoma in late 1986; he was visited during his last illness by many state and national political figures who were among his friends and admirers. Dr. Lawton died on May 18, 1987, and he is buried in Marshfield, WI.

References

American thoracic surgeons
People from Marshfield, Wisconsin
People from Viroqua, Wisconsin
United States Army Medical Corps officers
1922 births
1987 deaths
Wisconsin Democrats
Writers from Wisconsin
University of Wisconsin–Madison College of Letters and Science alumni
United States Army personnel of the Korean War
20th-century American writers
20th-century American male writers
20th-century surgeons
Military personnel from Wisconsin
Members of the National Academy of Medicine